The Partido Galing at Puso coalition ( PGP), was the political multi-party electoral alliance of the political parties and coalition opposition in the Philippines during the 2016 general elections.The coalition was composed of the Aksyon Demokratiko, Ako Bicol,
An Waray, Makabayan and
Nationalist People's Coalition

Election results

Presidential and vice presidential elections

Senatorial race

Results
5 out of the 12 candidates under the Partido Galing at Puso won a seat in the Senate.

References

Defunct political party alliances in the Philippines
2015 establishments in the Philippines
2016 disestablishments in the Philippines